Stunna Gambino (born 2001) is an American rapper, singer and songwriter from Washington Heights, New York. He is noted as a "SoundCloud rapper" who built his following from the releasing of independent music on the platform. He is currently signed to RCA Records.

Career 
Stunna Gambino started independently releasing music on the streaming platform SoundCloud at the age of 12. In 2019, he released his project Underrated, which is described as being responsible for his breakthrough. In December 2020, he received unintentional support from American singer Rihanna who shared his song "Demons" on her Instagram story. In July 2021, he appeared on American rapper and singer The Kid Laroi's single "Not Sober" alongside American rapper Polo G. In August 2021, he released his single "Zaza". In February 2022, he released his single "Evil" and its accompanying music video. In July 2022, he released his single "Warzone", a collaboration with fellow New York City rapper A Boogie wit da Hoodie. In August 2022, he released his project Vultures Don't Kry.

Musical style 
Robby Seabrook III, writing for XXL, describes Stunna Gambino's musical style in the following manner: "Stunna Gambino utilizes a kind of flow that cuts close to singing and back to rap, a sound that came to dominate New York City before drill became big." He cites American rappers Lil Durk and Roddy Ricch as his influences.

References

External links 
 

Living people
21st-century American rappers
2001 births
African-American male rappers
People from Washington Heights, Manhattan
Rappers from Manhattan
Rappers from New York (state)
Rappers from New York City